Peter Maduabuchi Utaka (born 12 February 1984) is a Nigerian professional footballer who plays as a forward for Ventforet Kofu. He is the younger brother of fellow professional footballer John Utaka.

Club career

Early career
Born in Enugu, Nigeria, Utaka moved to Croatia as a 16-year-old to play in Dinamo Zagreb after trying his luck at Ismaily where his older brother John was a cult figure. In 2003, he moved to Belgium from Dinamo and signed for K. Patro Eisden Maasmechelen of the 2nd division. KVC Westerlo moved to sign him the following season, and in his first season in the top flight and the transfer was worth €250,000.

Royal Antwerpen
Utaka joined Royal Antwerp FC in January 2007 where he became a first team regular, and he helped Antwerp qualify for the playoffs, finishing second. He also emerged top scorer with 22 goals and capped hs glorious season, winning the Best Striker's Award. He also put more gloss on his breath-taking performance that season, claiming the Most Valuable Player's award over eight times, making him one of the most feared strikers in Belgium. On 30 August 2008, it was announced that Utaka would join Danish club OB. for an undisclosed fee.

Odense Boldklub
Utaka joined Danish side OB in 2008. In his first season, he finished joint fourth place on the scorers list, while he led all scorers in his second season. In the 2009–10 Danish Superliga he finished with 18 goals in 33 matches, the first time in five years an OB player was top scorer in the league (last was Steffen Højer in 2004-05 with 20 goals).

Utaka stayed in OB for three and a half season winning three silver medals in his first three seasons in the Danish Superliga. He also represented the club in both UEFA Europa League and the 2011–12 Champions League qualifying phase scoring a total of nine goals in 22 European matches for the club.

Dalian Aerbin
In January 2012, Utaka moved to Chinese Super League club Dalian Aerbin. He scored 20 goals in 28 games in his first season. He also scored 11 consecutive fixtures to establish a new C-league record.

Beijing Guoan
He transferred to Beijing Guoan on 9 July 2013 in a €2 million transfer which made him the most expensive international signing in the history of the club. He scored 15 goals in 36 appearances in all competitions for the club, before he was loaned to Shanghai Shenxin during summer transfers in 2014, managing to score only four times in thirteen appearances in all competition for the Shanghai outfit.

Shimizu S-Pulse
In January 2015, Utaka transferred to J1 League-club Shimizu S-Pulse. The club faced a difficult season that year as they were battling relegation. At the end of the season, Utaka scored nine goals in 29 appearances, and the club ended up being seventeenth-placed, thus relegated into the J2 League.

Sanfrecce Hiroshima
The next year he was loaned to J1 League defending champions Sanfrecce Hiroshima. He scored his first goal for the club in the Japanese Super Cup final, in a 3–1 win against Gamba Osaka. Utaka bagged his first goal in the J1 League on 12 March, scoring a 67th-minute penalty against Shonan Bellmare in a 2–2 draw at home. He scored his next in a 5–1 away win against Omiya Ardija, scoring the opening in the 22nd minute.

FC Tokyo
After being bought by Sanfrecce Hiroshima, he was immediately loaned to FC Tokyo in March 2017. He scored four goals in his first three matches for the J1 League-club even though he started all of the matches on the bench. He represented the club 33 times and scored ten goals before he returned to Sanfrecce Hiroshima and his contract expired.

Vejle Boldklub
In February 2018, free agent Utaka trialled with Danish side Vejle Boldklub in Turkey, where the club was on a training camp. Utaka's agent Lucas Chang Jin was co-owner of Vejle Boldklub who at that time was topping the league table in the Danish second tier. On 14 February 2018, the club announced that Utaka had signed a contract with Vejle until the summer of 2018.

Tokushima Vortis
On 2018, Tokushima Vortis signed Peter Utaka mid-season.

Ventforet Kofu
Utaka signed to J2 club Ventforet Kofu ahead of the 2019 season.

Kyoto Sanga
On 23 December 2019, Utaka officially transferred to Kyoto Sanga FC ahead f the 2020 season. He helped the team to win promotion for the J1 League after the club's 12-year absence from it. He left the club after three years at Kyoto, playing his last match coming as a substitute on the 2022 J1/J2 promotion/relegation match, in which Kyoto eventually drew with Roasso Kumamoto, guaranteeing Kyoto the permanence on the J1.

Return to Ventforet Kofu 
On 30 December 2022, Utaka was announced by Ventforet Kofu as a new signing for the 2023 season, in his second stint with the Yamanashi-based club, returning to them after four seasons.

International career
On 21 September 2009, national coach Shaibu Amodu selected Utaka for the Nigeria national team. Utaka made his debut for Nigeria months later in a 5–2 home win over Congo DR on 3 March 2010, despite only getting his call up late after the NFF called his mother looking for him. He scored the first goal and assisted on the second. He scored twice in a Africa Cup of Nations qualification match against Ethiopia. His first goal of the match was the fastest goal in the qualifications for the season, scoring a goal after just 29 seconds into the match.

Career statistics

Club 

.

Honours
Sanfrecce Hiroshima
Japanese Super Cup: 2016

Individual
 Belgian Second Division top goalscorer: 2007–08
 Danish Superliga top goalscorer: 2009–10
 Chinese FA Cup top goalscorer: 2013
 J.League top goalscorer: 2016 (2011)

References

External links
 
 
 
 Career statistics at Danmarks Radio 
 Peter Utaka Career Statistics 

1984 births
Living people
Footballers from Enugu
Association football forwards
Nigerian footballers
K. Patro Eisden Maasmechelen players
GNK Dinamo Zagreb players
K.V.C. Westerlo players
Royal Antwerp F.C. players
Odense Boldklub players
Dalian Professional F.C. players
Beijing Guoan F.C. players
Shimizu S-Pulse players
Sanfrecce Hiroshima players
FC Tokyo players
Tokushima Vortis players
Vejle Boldklub players
Ventforet Kofu players
Kyoto Sanga FC players
Belgian Pro League players
Challenger Pro League players
Danish Superliga players
Chinese Super League players
J1 League players
J2 League players
Nigerian expatriate footballers
Expatriate footballers in Croatia
Expatriate footballers in Belgium
Expatriate men's footballers in Denmark
Expatriate footballers in China
Expatriate footballers in Japan
Nigerian emigrants to Belgium
Nigeria international footballers